Great Western Railway accidents include several notable incidents that influenced rail safety in the United Kingdom.

Notable accidents

Sonning

In common with other railway companies, the GWR experienced accidents throughout its history, one of the most serious being the Sonning Cutting accident in December 1842. Nine workmen were killed when their train hit a landslip. The accident occurred in the early hours of 24 December 1841 in the Sonning Cutting, near Reading, in Berkshire, as a mixed passenger/goods train travelling from London Paddington to Bristol entered the cutting. The train comprised the Leo class broad-gauge locomotive Hecla and its tender, three third-class passenger waggons and some heavily laden goods waggons. The passenger waggons were between the tender and the goods waggons. Recent heavy rain had saturated the soil in the cutting causing it to slip, covering the line on which the train was travelling. On running into the slipped soil the engine was derailed, and the passenger waggons were crushed between the goods waggons and the tender. Eight passengers died at the scene and seventeen were injured. In the ensuing investigation, the company was criticised not for the landslip (the civil engineering was deemed adequate) but for the inadequate state of the third class open wagon coaches, which failed to protect the passengers either from the weather or from being thrown out when the accident occurred.

The accident had important repercussions because it led to the Railway Regulation Act 1844. William Ewart Gladstone introduced his bill to regulate the way passengers were transported, such as protection of third-class passengers, and to introduce much greater government control of the growing network. The Act established the Parliamentary train with fares limited by statute.

Shipton

The most serious accident however, occurred on 24 December 1874, when a double-headed passenger train from Paddington to Birkenhead derailed near Kidlington just north of Oxford and 34 passengers were killed. The Shipton-on-Cherwell train crash was caused by the fracture of a single wheel on an old carriage just behind the locomotive's tender. The carriage continued upright until the drivers saw what had happened and applied the brakes. The following carriages crushed the old waggon and it was thrown off the track, with the rest of the train behind. The locomotives travelled some distance before the drivers realised what had happened and returned to help rescue efforts.

The investigation which followed was led by William Yolland and established the root causes very quickly. The tyre was on an old carriage, and was of an obsolete design. The fracture started at a rivet hole, possibly by metal fatigue, although it was not recognised as such by the inquiry. The weather was very cold that day, with snow blanketing the fields and very low freezing temperatures, another factor which hastened the tyre failure. The disaster led to a re-appraisal of braking methods and systems, and the eventual adoption of continuous automatic brakes being fitted to trains, based either on the Westinghouse air brake or a vacuum brake. The Railway Inspectorate recommended Mansell wheels, a type of wooden composite wheel, be adopted by the railway companies since the design had a better safety record than the alternatives. There had been a long history of failed wheels involved in serious accidents, especially in the previous decade. They were also critical of the communication method between the locomotive and the rest of the train using an external cord and gong, suggesting that a telegraphic method be adopted instead.

The Shipton disaster came in a period, the 1870s, when railway accidents were at their peak, never equalled before or since. The national network had grown enormously but basic equipment had been neglected, and old equipment kept in service when it should have been scrapped years before. The sequence of railway tragedies ended with the Tay rail bridge disaster of 1879, but accidents continued, although at a lower level.

List of Great Western Railway accidents

This list includes notable accidents on railways that were later amalgamated with the Great Western Railway.
Sonning Cutting, 24 December 1841 – 10 killed, 17 injured: train ran into landslide caused by heavy rain.
On  24 May 1847, GWR Prince Class locomotive Queen was nearing  with an up express from Exeter when one of the 7' driving wheel tyres broke. A fragment killed two drovers on a passing down train, which was derailed by another fragment.
Although the locomotive continued without derailment, the two wagons were thrown onto the platform, rebounded, and tore into the side of the leading coach of the express. Six passengers died, and thirteen were injured.
One person was killed.
In 1850, an excursion train collided with a horsebox at Wootton Bassett, Wiltshire. Following this accident, trap points and scotch blocks are provided at all sidings leading onto running lines.
On 20 October 1850, the special train celebrating the opening of the GWR broad gauge route to Birmingham, drawn by Iron Duke class Lord of the Isles and driven by Daniel Gooch, the GWR's locomotive engineer, crashed into a stationary mixed train at Aynho. Due to the stability of the broad gauge, neither train derailed, and only six injuries were reported (all in the stationary train). Lord of the Isles was unable to proceed, so the engine of the mixed train pulled the special to Banbury; it never reached Birmingham.
On 28 November 1852, a passenger train was derailed at Gatcombe, Gloucestershire.
Grove viaduct, 6 May 1859 – just two days after the opening of the Cornwall Railway a train was derailed near St Germans and fell off a viaduct killing three of the train crew.
On 28 June 1865, a ballast train derailed at Bruton, Somerset. The driver and fireman were killed.
On 5 November 1868, 4-4-0 locomotive Rob Roy was in a rear-end collision with a cattle train at Awse Junction, near Newnham, Gloucestershire.
Menheniot, 2 December 1873 (Cornwall Railway) – head-on collision on single line; no casualties: misunderstood signalman's verbal order.
Shipton-on-Cherwell, 24 December 1874; 34 killed, 69 injured: carriage tyre broke, derailed train on bridge over canal.
Ten people were killed and nine were injured.
On 8 March 1891, the locomotive of a relief passenger train was derailed near , Cornwall in blizzard conditions.
On 12 November 1894, a passenger train was derailed at Yetminster, Dorset when the track was damaged by flooding.
Menheniot, 9 February 1897 – reconstruction of Coldrennick Viaduct: workman's platform fell: 12 killed.
Menheniot, 15 November 1897 – reconstruction of Trevido Viaduct: accident raising a heavy timber: 2 killed.
In 1898, a mail train was derailed near Penryn, Cornwall due to defective track and the oscillation of the locomotive hauling it. Following this accident, the 3521 Class locomotives were rebuilt as tender locomotives.

 In 1898 Walter Peart and Henry Dean were the driver and fireman of the Great Western train known as the Windsor Express. On 18 July 1898, they were driving the 4:15 train from Windsor to Paddington when, just outside Acton, the connecting rod broke. Part of it was driven through the boiler casing and caused damage to the firebox which overwhelmed the men with cinders, steam and fire. They succeeded in applying the brake and bringing the train to a safe standstill before leaving the engine at Acton station.
On 16 June 1900, an express passenger train overran signals and crashed into the rear of a passenger train at Slough, Berkshire. Five people were killed and 35 were injured.
In 1904, an express passenger train was derailed at Loughor, Glamorgan due to excessive speed. Five people were killed and eighteen were injured.
 Thingley Junction, 16 January 1907 – Signal passed at danger: 0 killed, 12 injured. 
On 8 August 1913, a train overran signals and was in a rear-end collision with a passenger train at  station, Somerset. Two people were killed.
On 17 June 1914, an excursion train departed from  station, Berkshire against signals. An express passenger train was in a sidelong collision with it, killing one person.
On 3 January 1925, a freight train was derailed at Tir Phil, Glamorgan when the trackbed was washed away.
On 4 March 1933, a passenger train was struck by falling rocks at Vriog, Merionethshire. The locomotive and its tender were pushed into the Irish Sea, killing both crew.
On 15 January 1936, a freight train became divided near , Berkshire. Due to errors by its guard and a signalman, an express passenger train crashed into the six wagons that had neen left behind. Two people were killed.
One person was killed and six people were injured.
On 19 August 1938, a passenger train was sent into a siding at  station, Monmouthshire due to a signalman's error. Three people were injured.
Norton Fitzwarren, 4 November 1940 – 27 killed: driver misunderstood signal layout, drove off track.
On 2 July 1941, an express passenger train and a freight train were in a head-on collision at Slough, Berkshire. Five people were killed and 21 were injured.

References

See also 
 List of British rail accidents by death toll

 Accidents
Lists of railway accidents and incidents in England
Lists of railway accidents and incidents in Wales